Tom Dennis may refer to:

 Tom Dennis (rugby league) (fl. 1930s), rugby league footballer
 Tom Dennis (snooker player) (1882–1940), English snooker and billiards player

See also 
 Tom Denniss (born 1961), Australian athlete, inventor, scientist, and entrepreneur
 Thomas Dennis (disambiguation)